Juan Castillo may refer to:

Sports

Association football
Juan de Dios Castillo (1951–2014), Mexican football forward and manager
Juani (Juan José Castillo, born 1955), Spanish football midfielder
Juan Castillo (footballer, born 1970), Chilean football forward
Juan Castillo (soccer, born 1972), American soccer midfielder
Juan Castillo (footballer, born 1978), Uruguayan football goalkeeper
Juan José Castillo (footballer, born 1980), Guatemalan football forward
Juan Castillo (footballer, born 2000), Dutch football left-back
Juan Castillo (footballer, born 2002), Colombian footballer

Other sports
Juan Castillo (American football) (born 1959), American football coach
Juan Castillo (second baseman) (born 1962), Dominican baseball infielder
Juan Carlos Castillo (1964–1993), Colombian cyclist
José Castillo (runner) (Juan José Castillo, born 1968), Peruvian long-distance runner
Juan Castillo (pitcher) (born 1970), Venezuelan baseball pitcher

Others
Juan de Castillo (1470–1552), Portuguese architect
Juan del Castillo (bishop) (died 1593), Spanish Roman Catholic bishop
Juan del Castillo (c. 1590–c. 1657), Spanish Baroque painter
Juan de Castillo (Jesuit) (1595–1628), Spanish Jesuit priest
Juan Diego del Castillo (1744–1793), Spanish botanist
Juan Castillo (Uruguayan politician) (born 1952), Uruguayan politician and trade unionist

See also
Juan Castilla (disambiguation)
John Castillo (disambiguation)